San Mauro Cilento is a town and comune in the province of Salerno in the Campania region of south-western Italy.

History
The town was first mentioned in 1130. Its secondary toponym, Casalsoprano (or Casal Soprano, i. e. Upper Farmhouse), is closely related to the one of the nearby and lower village of Casalsottano (i.e. Lower Farmhouse).

Geography
San Mauro is a hillside town located in central Cilento, below the Stella mountain (1,131 amsl). It is divided into the quarters of Ratto, Serra, Sorrentini and Vallongella. Its municipal territory, part of the Cilento and Vallo di Diano National Park, spans to the coast and borders with Montecorice, Pollica, Serramezzana and Sessa Cilento.

Its hamlets (frazioni) are the villages of Casalsottano and Mezzatorre.

Culture
The town includes two little museums: the Eleousa, that includes an archive and a library, and the Parish Museum of San Mauro.

One of the most prominent cultural events is Settembre ai Fichi (i.e. "September to the Figs"), a sagra that is held every year from the end of August to the beginnings of September.

See also
Cilentan Coast
Cilentan dialect

References

External links

  Official website 
 San Mauro Cilento on comuni-italiani.it 

Cities and towns in Campania
Localities of Cilento